The Battle of Phaleron, or Battle of Analatos, took place on April 24 (6 May Gregorian ), 1827. The Greek rebel forces were being besieged inside the Acropolis of Athens by Ottoman forces under the command of Mehmed Reshid Pasha. Greek forces outside the city were desperately trying to break the siege.

Battle
In order to break the siege of Acropolis, the British officers Admiral Lord Cochrane and General Richard Church, who were nominally commanding the Greeks, decided to make an assault against the Turkish camp which was under the command of Mehmed Reshid Pasha.

Two days before the battle, on 22 April 1827, Georgios Karaiskakis, the general of Central Greece was fatally wounded in a minor clash with the Ottomans. He  perished one day later, his sudden death seriously damaged Greek morale and emboldened the Turks.
    
The battle began on 24 April, 3,000 men were ordered to advance across the plain. Their plan was to send 7,000 more men who were at Piraeus to attack the Ottomans from the flanks. Karaiskakis had proposed the day before instead of a direct attack, to cut the supply lines of the Ottomans in eastern Greece, but his proposal was not accepted.

As the Greeks advanced from Phaleron, Reshid sent some cavalry to attack the Greeks. He expected the main assault to come from Piraeus. The troops from Piraeus did not arrive and the rest of the Greeks were attacked by the Ottoman cavalry. The Greek army was totally destroyed and its troops scattered. All Souliotes and Cretans fell, 22 Philhellenes, 270 regular soldiers, hundreds of irregulars and the Greek chieftains Ioannis Notaras, Lampros Veikos, Georgios Drakos, Georgios Tzavelas and Tousias Botsaris were killed by the cavalry attack.

In total, the Greeks lost either 1,500  or 2,000 men, which was a devastating setback. The battle of Phaleron was seen as the greatest Greek defeat in the war of Independence. The men in the Acropolis surrendered on 5 June and were escorted by the French army to the coast. This defeat destroyed Greek morale and the only places on mainland Greece that persevered after the battle were Mani and Nafplio, seat of the government.

Aftermath
Later that year, the Great Powers, Imperial Russia, France, and Great Britain destroyed the Egyptian and Ottoman fleets in the Battle of Navarino.

References 

Bibliography
Paroulakis, Peter Harold. The Greeks: Their Struggle for Independence. Hellenic International Press, 1984. .

Phaleron
Phaleron
Phaleron
Phaleron
1827 in Greece
May 1827 events
Central Greece in the Greek War of Independence